Jón Helgason (21 June 1866 – 19 March 1942) was an Icelandic theologian who served as Bishop of Iceland from 1917 till 1939.

Biography
Helgason was born in Álftanes, on June 21, 1866, the son of the Reverend Helgi Hálfdanarson, later the rector of the Prestaskólinn (the Icelandic Seminary), and his wife Þórhildur Tómasdóttir. He came from a well-known family, including his grandfather Tómas Sæmundsson, a professor at Breiðabólstaður. Jón studied at the Reykjavik School between 1880 and 1886, then completed his degree and sailed the same summer in Copenhagen, where he completed various university degrees, including in Theology in 1892. He was taught in Reykjavík between 1892 and 1893, worked at a church in Denmark in 1893, completed two further examinations from the school in Höfn in 1894 and then travelled through Germany with a grant from the Danish government. There he learned about the German Bible and the publications of the prehistoric liberal theology.

In 1908 he was appointed director of the Prestaskóli. He was professor of theology at the University of Iceland 1911-1916, Dean of the Faculty of Theology for several years and the rector of the university between 1914 and 1915. Appointed Bishop of Iceland in 1916 and consecrated in 1917, and was granted an honorary doctorate in theology from the University of Copenhagen that same year and from the University of Iceland in 1936. He retired on January 1, 1939.

He wrote numerous books including:
Uppruni Nýja testamentisins, 1904
Almenn kristnisaga I-IV, 1912–30
Grundvöllurinn er Kristur, 1915
Þegar Reykjavík var 14 vetra, 1916
Hirðisbréf, 1917
Islands Kirke I-II, Kh. 1922-25
Kristnisaga Íslands I-II, 1925–27
Íslendingar í Danmörku, 1931
Kristur vort líf, predikanir, 1932
Meistari Hálfdan, 1935
Hannes Finnsson biskup, 1936
Jón Halldórsson í Hítardal, 1939
Tómas Sæmundsson, 1941
Þeir sem settu svip á bæinn, 1941
Árbækur Reykjavíkur 1786-1936, 1941

References 

1866 births
1942 deaths
Jón Helgason
20th-century Lutheran bishops
Academic staff of the University of Iceland
Rectors of the University of Iceland